Joint Private Medical Universities Admissions System (JPMAS) is a private medical university alliance test for enrolling transfer students in Taiwan. Student candidates for this test should take four subjects:
Chinese (medical Chinese)
English (medical English)
Biology (university basic Biology)
Chemistry (university basic Chemistry)

Private medical universities
Tzu Chi University
Kaohsiung Medical University
Chang Gung University
Chung Shan Medical University
China Medical University
Taipei Medical University

See also
List of universities in Taiwan
University alliances in Taiwan
 National University System of Taiwan

University systems in Taiwan